Ula is a district as well as the center town of the same district in Muğla Province in the Aegean region of Turkey in south-west Anatolia. Its name reflects the ancient town of Ula in ancient Caria, whose site is conjectured to be nearby.

The town of Ula is situated at a distance of only  from the province seat of Muğla, a mile after a bifurcation on the road to Marmaris. It is notable for its old houses in the Turkish style and the vast forest region that extends to the south along the country road called Çiçekli after the town. The history of the inhabitants and the town, situated in ancient Caria, can be traced at least as far back as the dynasty of Menteşe.

The townships of Akyaka and Gökova, situated at a close distance to each other at the tip of the Gulf of Gökova, both of which are rising centers of international tourism and which possess their own municipalities depend Ula administratively. Aside from Akyaka and Gökova, Ula is the administrative seat having in its charge a total of twenty-three villages.

See also
 Akyaka, Muğla
 Gökova
 Sedir Island

References

 Municipality of Ula District - General information on Ula, Muğla

External links

 Images of a lake in Ula District

Populated places in Muğla Province
Districts of Muğla Province